Nocher is a village in the commune of Goesdorf, in north-western Luxembourg.  , the village had a population of 221.

Villages in Luxembourg
Wiltz (canton)